Dorje Lopon Ngawang Jigdral Rinpoche, is a Nyingma tulku of Sherpa decent.

References

 Pema Namding Monastery, Regd No.31. AFF No. 17989
 Dzambhala Puja on Sunday, September 6, 2015 at Chùa Quan Âm Phổ Chiếu Ni Viện in New Carrollton, MD flyer

1982 births
Nyingma tulkus
Nyingma lamas
Tibetan Buddhists from Nepal
20th-century lamas
Living people
Sherpa people